Fraser's sunbird (Deleornis fraseri) or the scarlet-tufted sunbird, is a species of bird in the family Nectariniidae.
It is found in Angola, Cameroon, Central African Republic, Republic of the Congo, Democratic Republic of the Congo, Ivory Coast, Equatorial Guinea, Gabon, Ghana, Guinea, Liberia, Mali, Nigeria, Sierra Leone, Tanzania, Togo, and Uganda.

References

Fraser's sunbird
Birds of the Gulf of Guinea
Birds of Sub-Saharan Africa
Fraser's sunbird
Taxonomy articles created by Polbot